Wat Moha Montrey ("Grand Minister Pagoda") is a wat located on Sihanouk Boulevard in Phnom Penh, Cambodia. Built in 1970, it was used by the Khmer Rouge between 1975 and 1979 as a storage house for rice and corn. The tower measures 35 metres in height. The temple was named in honor of Chakrey Ponn, King Monivong's War Minister. Moha Montrey means "The Great Minister".

References

External links
Photo

Buddhist temples in Phnom Penh
Religious buildings and structures completed in 1970
20th-century Buddhist temples